Gilbreath's conjecture is a conjecture in number theory regarding the sequences generated by applying the forward difference operator to consecutive prime numbers and leaving the results unsigned, and then repeating this process on consecutive terms in the resulting sequence, and so forth. The statement is named after Norman L. Gilbreath who, in 1958, presented it to the mathematical community after observing the pattern by chance while doing arithmetic on a napkin. In 1878, eighty years before Gilbreath's discovery, François Proth had, however, published the same observations along with an attempted proof, which was later shown to be false.

Motivating arithmetic 

Gilbreath observed a pattern while playing with the ordered sequence of prime numbers

2, 3, 5, 7, 11, 13, 17, 19, 23, 29, 31, ...

Computing the absolute value of the difference between term n + 1 and term n in this sequence yields the sequence

1, 2, 2, 4, 2, 4, 2, 4, 6, 2, ...

If the same calculation is done for the terms in this new sequence, and the sequence that is the outcome of this process, and again ad infinitum for each sequence that is the output of such a calculation, the following five sequences in this list are

1, 0, 2, 2, 2, 2, 2, 2, 4, ...
1, 2, 0, 0, 0, 0, 0, 2, ...
1, 2, 0, 0, 0, 0, 2, ...
1, 2, 0, 0, 0, 2, ...
1, 2, 0, 0, 2, ...

What Gilbreath—and François Proth before him—noticed is that the first term in each series of differences appears to be 1.

The conjecture 

Stating Gilbreath's observation formally is significantly easier to do after devising a notation for the sequences in the previous section. Toward this end, let  denote the ordered sequence of prime numbers, and define each term in the sequence  by

 

where  is positive. Also, for each integer  greater than 1, let the terms in  be given by

 

Gilbreath's conjecture states that every term in the sequence  for positive  is equal to 1.

Verification and attempted proofs 

, no valid proof of the conjecture has been published. As mentioned in the introduction, François Proth released what he believed to be a proof of the statement that was later shown to be flawed. Instead of evaluating n rows, Odlyzko evaluated 635 rows and established that the 635th row started with a 1 and continued with only 0s and 2s for the next n numbers. This implies that the next n rows begin with a 1.

Generalizations
In 1980, Martin Gardner published a conjecture by Hallard Croft that stated that the property of Gilbreath's conjecture (having a 1 in the first term of each difference sequence) should hold more generally for every sequence that begins with 2, subsequently contains only odd numbers, and has a sufficiently low bound on the gaps between consecutive elements in the sequence. This conjecture has also been repeated by later authors. However, it is false: for every initial subsequence of 2 and odd numbers, and every non-constant growth rate, there is a continuation of the subsequence by odd numbers whose gaps obey the growth rate but whose difference sequences fail to begin with 1 infinitely often.  is more careful, writing of certain heuristic reasons for believing Gilbreath's conjecture that "the arguments above apply to many other sequences in which the first element is a 1, the others even, and where the gaps between consecutive elements are not too large and are sufficiently random." However, he does not give a formal definition of what "sufficiently random" means.

See also
 Difference operator
 Prime gap
 Rule 90, a cellular automaton that controls the behavior of the parts of the rows that contain only the values 0 and 2

References

Analytic number theory
Conjectures about prime numbers
Unsolved problems in number theory
Triangles of numbers